Šebrelje is a village in the Municipality of Cerkno in the traditional Littoral region of Slovenia.

The parish church in the settlement is dedicated to Saint George and belongs to the Koper Diocese.  A second church, belonging to the same parish, is built outside the settlement to the north and is dedicated to John the Baptist.

References

External links
 
 Šebrelje on Geopedia

Populated places in the Municipality of Cerkno